Gilles Archambault (born September 19, 1933 in Montreal, Quebec) is a francophone novelist from Quebec, Canada.

He studied at the Université de Montréal in 1957, and then worked at Radio-Canada, while working as a  journalist. From 1988 to 1997, he broadcast a column on the "CBF Bonjour" program.
His work appeared in La Presse, Le Devoir, L'Actualité, and Le Livre d'ici.

He won the Prix Athanase-David in 1981 for his body of work, and a Governor General's Award in 1987 for L'obsédante obèse et autres aggressions, a collection of short prose pieces.

He has also written extensively about jazz.
His papers are held at the Library of Canada.

Novels and Short Story Collections
Une suprême discrétion (1963)
La vie à trois (1965)
Le tendre matin (1969)
Parlons de moi (1970)
La fleur aux dents (1971)
Enfances lointaines (1972), stories
La fuite immobile (1974)
Les Pins parasols (1976)
Stupeurs et autres écrits (1979), stories
Le voyageur distrait (1981)
À voix basse (1983)
L'obsédante obèse et autres aggressions (1987) (winner of the 1987 Governor General's Award for fiction)
Les choses d'un jour (1991)
Un après-midi de septembre (1993)
Un homme plein d'enfance (1996)
Les Maladresses du cœur (1998)
Courir à sa perte (2000)
De si douce dérives (2003), stories
De l'autre côté du pont (2004)
Les Rives prochaines (2007)
Nous étions jeunes encore (2009)
Qui de nous deux?, Montréal, Boréal (2011)
Lorsque le cœur est sombre, Montréal, Boréal (2013)
Doux Dément, Montréal, Boréal (2015)
Il se fait tard, Montréal, Boréal (2021)

Anthologies

Autobiographical works
Un après-midi de septembre (concerning his mother's disappearance)
Qui de nous deux? (2011)

References

External links

 Archives of Filles Archambault (Fonds Gilles Archambault, R11700) are held at Library and Archives Canada

1933 births
Living people
Canadian male novelists
French Quebecers
Writers from Montreal
Governor General's Award-winning fiction writers
Prix Athanase-David winners
20th-century Canadian novelists
21st-century Canadian novelists
Canadian novelists in French
20th-century Canadian male writers
21st-century Canadian male writers